The 1978 All-SEC football team consists of American football players selected to the All-Southeastern Conference (SEC) chosen by various selectors for the 1978 NCAA Division I-A football season.

Offensive selections

Receivers 

 Cris Collinsworth, Florida (UPI-1)
 Mardye McDole, Miss. St. (UPI-1)

Tight ends

Tackles 

 Robert Dugas, LSU (UPI-1)
Jim Bunch, Alabama (UPI-1)

Guards 
Dan Fowler, Kentucky (UPI-1)
Matt Braswell, Georgia (UPI-1)

Centers 
Dwight Stephenson, Alabama (UPI-1)

Quarterbacks 

 Dave Marler, Miss. St. (UPI-1)

Halfbacks 

 Willie McClendon, Georgia (UPI-1)
Charles Alexander, LSU (College Football Hall of Fame) (UPI-1)

Fullbacks
Joe Cribbs, Auburn (UPI-1)

Defensive selections

Ends 
Wayne Hamilton, Alabama (UPI-1)
John Adams, LSU (UPI-1)

Tackles 
Marty Lyons, Alabama (UPI-1)
Charlie Cage, Ole Miss (UPI-1)

Middle guards
Richard Jaffe, Kentucky (UPI-1)

Linebackers 
Barry Krauss, Alabama (UPI-1)
Jim Kovach, Kentucky (UPI-1)
Scot Brantley, Florida (UPI-1)

Backs 
Roland James, Tennessee (UPI-1)
James McKinney, Auburn (UPI-1)
Chris Williams, LSU (UPI-1)

Special teams

Kickers
Rex Robinson, Georgia (UPI-1)

Punters
Jim Miller, Ole Miss (UPI-1)

Key
AP = Associated Press

UPI = United Press International

Bold = Consensus first-team selection by both AP and UPI

See also
1978 College Football All-America Team

References

All-SEC
All-SEC football teams